This is a list of notable people from Bolton in North West England. The demonym of Bolton is Boltonian. This list includes people from the towns of Farnworth, Horwich, Westhoughton, Kearsley, Little Lever, Blackrod, and other smaller places within the Metropolitan Borough of Bolton. This list is arranged alphabetically by surname:



A
Alan Ainscow (born 1953) – former professional footballer (Blackpool, Everton, Blackburn Rovers and Rochdale
Alyn Ainsworth (1924–1990) – band leader, orchestra conductor and musical director
Simon Aldred – lead singer of Cherry Ghost
Tom Aldred (born 1990) – professional footballer with Bury, formerly of Carlisle United, Watford, Accrington Stanley and Blackpool.
Monica Ali (born 1967) – author, born in East Pakistan (now Bangladesh), but settled and grew up in Bolton, former pupil at Bolton School
Sir Richard Arkwright (1732–1792) – inventor of the Water Frame, born in Preston
Henry Ashworth (1794–1880) – cotton mill owner (Egerton and New Eagley mills) and political reformer, born at Birtenshaw farm, Turton
Ian Aspinall (born 1961) – actor, played roles in Holby City and East is East
Gordon Astall (1927-2020) England footballer, born in Horwich
Gordon Atherton (born 1934), footballer 
Adam Burrows (born 1993) Resides in San Francisco C.A – former Program Manager [Turner & Townsend]

B
Hylda Baker (1905–1986) – actress, comedian and music hall star, born in Farnworth
Alan Ball (1945–2007) – professional footballer, member of the 1966 Football World Cup winning side, born in Farnworth
Johnny Ball (born 1938) – born in Bristol but moved to Bolton, children's TV presenter and father of former BBC Radio 1 DJ and TV host, Zoë Ball
Tommy Banks (born 1929) – Bolton Wanderers and England footballer, born in Farnworth
Sir Thomas Barlow (1845–1945) – royal physician, born in Edgworth
Christopher Barrow (born 1982) – cricketer, born Bolton.
Niamh Blackshaw (born 1999) – actress, born in Manchester and educated in Bolton
Danny Boyle (born 1956) – film director, born in Radcliffe, Greater Manchester, but educated in Bolton
Jack Bond (1932-2019) – cricketer, born in Kearsley
Liam Boyle (born 1985) – TV and film actor – born in Bolton, but raised in Heywood, Greater Manchester
Harry Brockbank (born 1998) – Professional Footballer, ex-Bolton Wanderers, currently El Paso Locomotive in the United States.
John Brocklehurst (1927-2005) - professional footballer. Born in Horwich 
Jack Bruton (1903–1986) – footballer for Bolton Wanderers, Burnley and England, born in Westhoughton
Andrew Buchan (born 1979) – TV and stage actor, born in Stockport and brought up in Lostock

C
Jim Cartwright (born 1958) – Playwright, best known for his first play Road and the play/film Little voice
Stephen Cartwright (1947–2004) – illustrator
Katy Cavanagh (born 1973) – English actress, best known for appearances in Coronation Street as Julie Carp since 2008, raised in Bolton
Samuel Taylor Chadwick (1809–1876) – doctor, politician and philanthropist, born in Urmston but raised in Bolton
Mark Charnock (born 1968) – actor, currently playing Marlon Dingle in Emmerdale
Gabriel Clark (1998) - Actor, known for Coronation Street and for playing Oliver Morgan in Hollyoaks.
Phil Clarke – Blackrod- born ex-Rugby league international player and presently Sky Sports pundit
Tom Clough (1867–1943) – landscape artist
Sir Daniel Cooper (1821–1902) – first speaker of New South Wales Legislative Assembly
Thomas Cole (1801–1848) – American landscape painter
Joel Coleman (born 1995) – current professional footballer with Rochdale, formerly of Oldham Athletic, Huddersfield Town and Fleetwood Town.
Sara Cox (born 1974) – Radio 1 DJ. and TV presenter
Philip Craven (born 1950) – International Paralympic Committee President
Samuel Crompton (1753–1827) – inventor of the Spinning Mule
John Cunliffe (born 1984) – former footballer for Major League Soccer side Chivas USA – born in Bolton and raised in Edgworth
Sian Charlesworth (born 1987) – member of girl band Parade
Lee Chambers (psychologist) - psychologist, entrepreneur and radio host.

D
Charles James Darbishire (1797–1874), Bolton's first mayor, was sympathetic to Chartism and a supporter of the Anti-Corn Law League.
Julian Darby (born 1967) – ex-footballer, now youth team coach at Bolton Wanderers
Norman Davies (born 1939) – historian
John Davis (1943–2000) – cricketer
Hilary Devey (1957-2022) – entrepreneur and TV personality, a dragon in BBC2's Dragons' Den (2011), born in Tonge Moor
Fred Dibnah (1938–2004) – steeplejack, engineer and TV presenter, born in Farnworth
Sir Benjamin Alfred Dobson (1847–1898) – textile machinery manufacturer and Mayor of Bolton.

F
Vic Faulkner, (1944–2017) – wrestler, won World of Sport Wrestler of the Year and was European Middleweight Wrestling Champion between 1966 and 1973 and British Welterweight Wrestling Champion between 1973 and 1977.
William Farrimond (1903–1979) – Lancashire County cricketer
Shirley Anne Field (born Shirley Broomfield 1938) – stage, film and television actress
Frank Finlay (1926–2016) – Farnworth-born stage, film and television actor
David Flitcroft (born 1974) – professional footballer, Preston North End, Chester City, Rochdale, Macclesfield Town and Bury, ex-manager of Barnsley, Bury, Swindon Town and Mansfield Town, ex-assistant Manager at Bolton Wanderers.
Garry Flitcroft (born 1972) – professional footballer with Manchester City, Blackburn Rovers, Sheffield United and England U21s, ex-manager of Chorley F.C.
Stu Francis (born 1951) – comedian, Crackerjack presenter
Peter Freeman (born 1946) – heavyweight boxer, fought Leon Spinks.

G
Damon Gough (born 1969) known as Badly Drawn Boy – indie singer-songwriter
John Grisdale (1845–1922) – Bishop of Qu'Appelle, Canada
Aaron Grundy (born 1988) – professional footballer, currently goalkeeper for Chorley F.C.

H
Leslie Halliwell (1929–1989) – English film historian and encyclopedist of Halliwell's Film Guide fame
Charles Hallows (1895–1972) – county cricketer, Wisden Cricketer of the Year, 1928
James Hallows (1873–1910) – county cricketer, Wisden Cricketer of the Year, 1905.
Mark Halsey (born 1961) – former English Premier League Referee, lives in Little Lever, born in Essex
Haseeb Hameed (born 1997) – Nottinghamshire and England cricketer, born in Bolton
Tom Hamer (born 1999) – professional footballer, currently Burton Albion, formerly Oldham Athletic. 
John Hanscomb (1924-2019) – retired Conservative politician
Frank Hardcastle (1844–1908) – businessman, MP and cricketer, born in Tonge
Jack Harrison (born 1996) – professional footballer for Leeds United, born in Stoke-on-Trent, raised in Bolton.
Sam Hart (born 1996) – professional footballer for Oldham Athletic, formerly of Liverpool, Port Vale, Blackburn Rovers and Southend United , born in Horwich
John Harwood (1893–1964) – invented self-winding wristwatch
Annie Haslam (born 1947) – lead singer of progressive rock band Renaissance.
Robert Haslam (1923-2002) – industrialist, born in Bolton
William Haslam (1850–1898) – gave name to town of Haslam, South Australia
Paul Heathcote (born 1960) – chef and restaurateur, born in Farnworth
Stan Heptinstall (born 1946) – Professor of Thrombosis and Haemostasis at University of Nottingham and Mayor of Broxtowe, born in Bolton
John Hick (1815–1894) – industrialist, partner in B. Hick and Sons, MP and art collector, born in Bolton
Gordon Hill (born 1928) – League football referee]] in 1960s and 1970s
Keith Hill (born 1969) – former professional footballer with Blackburn Rovers and Plymouth Argyle, ex manager of Rochdale, Barnsley, Bolton Wanderers and Tranmere Rovers.
Charles Holden (1875–1960) – architect, known for designs of London Underground stations
Simon Holt (born 1958) - composer
Nicky Hunt (born 1983) – professional footballer currently playing for Ashton United having played for Bolton Wanderers, Bristol City, Preston North End, Accrington Stanley, Mansfield Town Leyton Orient and Notts County
Jack Hylton (1892–1965) – band leader, born in Great Lever

I
Susan Sutherland Isaacs (1885–1948) – educational psychologist and psychoanalyst, born in Turton
 Sahir Iqbal (born 1996), Professional Boxer, WBC World Youth Welterweight Champion.

J
Will Jääskeläinen (born 1998) – professional footballer (Crewe Alexandra) 
David Jack (1898–1958) – footballer for Bolton Wanderers who scored first goal at Wembley, 1923
Ethel Johnson (1908–1964) – sprinter for Britain at the 1932 Summer Olympics, born in Westhoughton
Danny Jones (born 1986) – guitarist and vocalist in British pop-rock band McFly, coach on The Voice Kids (UK TV series)

K
Peter Kay (born 1973) – comedian, actor, writer and producer, born in Farnworth
Vernon Kay (born 1974) – TV presenter and DJ
Sir Jason Kenny (born 1988) – 2008, 2012 and 2016 Summer Olympics track cycling gold medallist, born in Farnworth. British athlete with most gold medals in history (six)
Amir Khan (born 1986) – professional boxer (light-welterweight world champion)
Georgia King (born 1998) – Television actress
Thomas Penyngton Kirkman (1806–1895) – mathematician, FRS
Andy Knowles (born 1981) – musician and artist
Tony Knowles (born 1955) – snooker player
Sir Harold Kroto (1939–2016) – chemist, Nobel Prize winner in 1996 for his work on Buckminsterfullerene, born in Wisbech, raised in Bolton

L
Roy Lancaster (born 1938) – gardener and broadcaster, Gardeners' World, born in Farnworth
Thomas Lancashire (born 1985) – professional runner, represented Britain at the 2008 Summer Olympics
William Lassell (1799–1880) – astronomer, discoverer of the moons Ariel and Triton
Tommy Lawton (1919–1996) – professional footballer, Burnley, Everton, Arsenal, Chelsea and England, born in Farnworth
Francis Lee (born 1944) – footballer with Bolton Wanderers, Manchester City, Derby County, and England (27 caps)
James Darcy Lever (1854–1910) – born in Bolton, co-founder of Lever Brothers, which became Unilever
William Lever, 1st Viscount Leverhulme (1851–1925) – born in Bolton, co-founder of Lever Brothers which became Unilever.
Ralf Little (born 1980) – actor, star of The Royle Family, Two Pints of Lager and a Packet of Crisps and Children's Ward, born in Oldham, educated at Bolton School
Nat Lofthouse (1925–2011) – footballer, played for Bolton Wanderers and England
Kate Long (born 1964) – bestselling author of The Bad Mother's Handbook, brought up in Blackrod
Peter Lown (born 1947) – born in Bolton, a Canadian field hockey player, competing in the 1976 Summer Olympics.
 Stan Lynn (1928-2002) - professional footballer (Accrington Stanley, Aston Villa and Birmingham City)

M
Sajid Mahmood (born 1981) – Lancashire and England cricketer.
Paul Mariner (1953–2021) – professional footballer with Plymouth Argyle, Ipswich Town, Arsenal and Portsmouth, born in Farnworth and grew-up in Horwich.
George Marsh (1515–1555) – born in Deane, a Protestant martyr for his faith at Boughton, Chester
Lee Mason (born 1971) – English Premier League referee, educated at Thornleigh Salesian College in Bolton
Patrick McGuinness (born 1973) – stand-up comedian and comedy actor
Sir Ian McKellen (born 1939) – stage and film actor, born in Burnley and educated at Bolton School
William Meadows (1833–1920) – American politician, served in the Wisconsin State Assembly
Thomas Moran (1837–1926) – American landscape painter
Diane Morgan (born 1975) – Actress, comedian, and writer
Geoffrey Moorhouse (1931-2009) – travel writer, novelist and poet
Thomas Sutcliffe Mort (1816-1878) - Industrialist, benefactor, Australian businessman
Clive Myrie (born 1964) – BBC news correspondent and presenter

N
Carlo Nash (born 1973) – footballer with Crystal Palace, Stockport County, Manchester City, Middlesbrough, Preston North End, Wigan Athletic, Everton and Stoke City
Bill Naughton (1910–1992) – author and playwright, born in Ireland but educated in Bolton, work often being set in the town, in which he grew up
Paul Nicholls (born 1979) – TV and film actor in EastEnders, City Central and Ackley Bridge
Oliver Norburn (born 1992) – footballer, currently playing for Peterborough United and the Grenada national team. 
David Norwood (born 1968) – chess grand master, chess writer, and businessman, represents Andorra at chess.

O
Andrew Oldcorn (born 1960) – professional golfer, born in Bolton and brought up in Edinburgh
Glyn Owen (1928–2004) – stage and TV actor

P
Tom Parker, (1988–2022) – member of pop boy band The Wanted
Maxine Peake (born 1974) – actress, played in Shameless, born in Westhoughton
Jimmy Phillips (born 1966) – Former Professional Footballer with Bolton Wanderers, Rangers, Oxford United and Middlesbrough.
Nathaniel Phillips (born 1997) – Professional Footballer with Liverpool.
Dick Pollard (1912–1985) – test cricketer, born in Westhoughton
Mike Pollitt (born 1972) – goalkeeper coach for Preston North End, born in Farnworth.
Eva Pope (born 1967) – actress, born in Wigan
David Andrew Phoenix (born 1966) – biochemist and educationalist
Hovis Presley, real name: Richard Henry McFarlane (1960–2005) – poet and comedian

R
Mark Radcliffe (born 1958) – Radio 1 DJ, TV presenter and writer – educated at Bolton School
Dorning Rasbotham (c. 1730–1791) – writer, antiquarian and artist, High Sheriff of Lancashire for 1769, born in Manchester
John Frankland Rigby (1933–2014), mathematician
 John Roberts, founder of AO World
David Ruffley (born 1962) – politician, Conservative MP for Bury St Edmunds, educated at Bolton School
Jenny Ryan (born 1982) – television personality, professional quizzer on ITV quiz show The Chase

S
Charles Allan Shaw (1927–1989) – Dean of Bulawayo, then of Ely, born in Westhoughton
Robert Shaw (1927–1978) – actor and writer, born in Westhoughton, moved to Scotland as a child
Nigel Short (born 1965) – chess grand master, educated at Bolton School
Gerard Corley Smith (1909–1997) – diplomat and environmentalist
Denys Corley Smith (1922–1989) – author and journalist
Dave Spikey (born 1951) – actor, comedian, writer and film producer
Dale Stephens (born 1989) – professional footballer with Burnley FC

T
Françoise Taylor (1920–2007) – artist, born in Belgium, but lived and worked in Bolton for over 50 years, noted for 1950s Bolton street scenes
Thomas Taylor (1851–1916) – cotton-mill owner, MP for Bolton 1912–1916
Thomas Thomasson (1808–1876) – cotton spinner, political economist and benefactor
John Pennington Thomasson (1841–1904) – cotton spinner, MP and benefactor
Frank Tyson (1930-2015) – Northants and England cricketer – known as "Typhoon Tyson"

W
Mike Watkinson (born 1961) – ex-England cricketer, formally coach for Lancashire, born in Westhoughton
Al Weaver (born 1981) – actor, plays a fledgling Anglican curate in TV series Grantchester (since 2014).
Keith Welch (born 1968) – former professional footballer with Rochdale, Bristol City and Northampton Town. 
Simon Whaley (born 1985) – Former professional footballer, Bury, Preston North End, Norwich City, Chesterfield and Doncaster Rovers
Robert Whitehead (1823–1905) – developed first self-propelled torpedo and great-grandfather of the Von Trapp children (Sound of Music), born in Little Bolton
Jason Wilcox (born 1971) – Former professional footballer, Blackburn Rovers, Leeds United and England
Sophie Willan (born 1987) - actor/comedienne.
Thomas Willoughby, 11th Baron Willoughby of Parham (c. 1602 – 1691/92) – peer in the House of Lords
Sammy Winward (born 1985) – actress, singer and model, notably playing Katie Sugden in Emmerdale
Bernard Wrigley (born 1948) – comedian, actor, playwright and musician

See also
List of Mayors of Bolton
List of Bolton Wanderers F.C. managers
List of Bolton Wanderers F.C. players
List of people from Greater Manchester

References

People from the Metropolitan Borough of Bolton
Lists of English people by location
Bolton
Bolton
Bolton
Bolton